Stephanie Dawn Thacker (née Young; born August 22, 1965) is a United States circuit judge of the United States Court of Appeals for the Fourth Circuit.

Early life and education 

Born Stephanie Dawn Young in Huntington, West Virginia, she was raised in Hamlin, West Virginia. Thacker earned a Bachelor of Arts degree in marketing, magna cum laude, from Marshall University in 1987 and her Juris Doctor, with honors, from West Virginia University in 1990.

Professional career 

After graduating from law school, Thacker spent two years working in the Pittsburgh office of the law firm Kirkpatrick & Lockhart (now K&L Gates). She then worked briefly for the West Virginia Office of the Attorney General before joining the law firm King, Betts & Allen. In 1994, Thacker took a job in the United States Attorney's office for the Southern District of West Virginia, serving as an Assistant United States Attorney in the Criminal Division and handling a wide range of criminal prosecutions.

In 1999, Thacker moved to Washington, D.C. to work as a trial attorney in the United States Department of Justice's Child Exploitation and Obscenity Section. She worked there for seven years, serving as Deputy Chief of Litigation for two years and then as Principal Deputy Chief of Litigation for five years. She also was part of the team that prosecuted the first case the United States ever brought involving the Violence Against Women Act. In 2006, Thacker joined the Charleston, West Virginia, law firm Guthrie & Thomas as a partner.

Federal judicial service 
In July 2011, the West Virginia Record reported that President Obama would select Thacker to the judicial vacancy on the United States Court of Appeals for the Fourth Circuit that was created by the death of Judge M. Blane Michael. On September 8, 2011, Obama formally nominated her. The Judiciary Committee reported her nomination out of the committee on November 3, 2011 by a voice vote. The United States Senate confirmed her nomination on April 16, 2012 by a 91–3 vote. She received her commission on April 17, 2012.

In October 2017, Thacker wrote for the panel majority when it found that the Bladensburg Peace Cross memorial from World War I now violated the Constitution's Establishment Clause and ordering either its arms removed or the entire monument razed. Her judgement was ultimately reversed by the U.S. Supreme Court in American Legion v. American Humanist Association (2019).

In April 2018, Thacker wrote for the majority when it found that a Maryland law prohibiting price gouging in prescription drug prices violated the constitution's Dormant Commerce Clause.

See also 
 List of first women lawyers and judges in West Virginia

References

External links 

1965 births
Living people
21st-century American judges
Assistant United States Attorneys
Judges of the United States Court of Appeals for the Fourth Circuit
Marshall University alumni
Pennsylvania lawyers
People from Hamlin, West Virginia
Lawyers from Huntington, West Virginia
United States court of appeals judges appointed by Barack Obama
United States Department of Justice lawyers
West Virginia University College of Law alumni
21st-century American women judges